Piotr Jürgen Sobotta (born 12 November 1940) is a Polish athlete. He competed in the men's high jump at the 1960 Summer Olympics.

References

1940 births
Living people
Athletes (track and field) at the 1960 Summer Olympics
Polish male high jumpers
Olympic athletes of Poland
Sportspeople from Gliwice